Saddleworth Museum is an independent museum in Uppermill village, Saddleworth, Metropolitan Borough of Oldham, Greater Manchester, England. It is a registered charity and was accredited by the MLA.

The museum opened in 1962 and is housed in the outbuildings of the Victoria Mill, a 19th-century mill building which stood beside the Huddersfield Narrow Canal. Its collections show the history of Saddleworth,  which until 1974 local government reorganisation was part of the West Riding of Yorkshire.
In September 2015 the museum closed for repair and remedial work to be undertaken and there was a temporary cabin in place while work on the building continued. the museum re-opened a year later in September 2016 after a £1.25 million refurbishment.

References

External links

18 paintings from the museum at Art UK

Local museums in Greater Manchester
Saddleworth
Museums established in 1962
1962 establishments in England
Art museums and galleries in Greater Manchester